Nallur is a village in the Sathyamangalam tehsil of Erode district in Tamil Nadu, India.

Demographics

According to the 2011 census of India, Nallur had a population of 8714 people and was classified as a gram panchayat. This included 4393 males and 4321 females. The village had an overall literacy rate of 72.68% with male literacy and female literacy standing at 80.85% and 64.37%, respectively. There were around 2586 households in Nallur with scheduled castes making up nearly 19.94% of the total population.

Schools

The Panchayat Union primary school was established in Nallur in 1927. The school today has computer aided learning methods for primary school students of classes between 1 and 5. The medium of instruction in the school is Tamil. In addition to this, Nallur is also home to SRC Memorial Matriculation School that is co-educational with hostel facilities for boys and girls.

References

Villages in Erode district